Péter Piti (4 June 1935 – 31 January 1978) was a Hungarian wrestler. He competed in the men's Greco-Roman light heavyweight at the 1960 Summer Olympics.

References

External links
 

1935 births
1978 deaths
Hungarian male sport wrestlers
Olympic wrestlers of Hungary
Wrestlers at the 1960 Summer Olympics
People from Szentes
Sportspeople from Csongrád-Csanád County
20th-century Hungarian people